The start and end dates of a season on any planet of the Solar System depends on same factors valid on Earth, but which have different values on different planets:

 North Pole direction (rotation axis direction)
 Vernal equinox direction
 Orbit eccentricity
 Year duration
 Orbit plane inclination

All these factors affect how much energy from Sun falls on all the points at a same given latitude (i.e. a parallel) on the planet during daytime; if such amount of energy changes during the year, the planet has seasons.

North Pole and rotation axis 
If the rotation axis of the planet is not perpendicular to the orbit plane, the incidence of the Sun on each point of planet surface will change during the year, which is the main reason of existence of seasons.

Equinox direction 
Given the different Sun incidence in different positions in the orbit, it is necessary to define a standard point of the orbit of the planet, to define the planet position in the orbit at each moment of the year w.r.t such point; this point is called with several names: vernal equinox, spring equinox, March equinox, all equivalent, and named considering northern hemisphere seasons. This point is defined as the point in the celestial sphere where the Sun appears in a specific moment of the year:

 the date is one of the two of the equinoxes on the planet, when daytime and nighttime are of approximately equal duration all over the planet. The word is derived from the Latin 'aequinoctium', from 'aequus' (equal) and 'nox' (genitive 'noctis') (night).
 in that date the apparent position of Sun in the sky (subsolar point) appears to leave the Southern Hemisphere and to cross the celestial equator, heading northward as seen from the planet. The date when instead the subsolar point appears to cross the equator southward is the other equinox, named autumn equinox. There are only two equinoxes in one year.

Orbit eccentricity 
Orbit eccentricity causes the planet/Sun distance to change during the year: The higher is the eccentricity, the higher is the change; Sun rays intensity in various moments of the year changes as the planet/Sun distance changes. Earth eccentricity is very low (0.0167 in a scale from 0 to 1.0000), hence it does not affect so much temperature changes during the year.

Year duration 
Conventionally one year is divided in 4 seasons, hence their duration is different if the year duration in Earth days is different.

Data needed for the determination of planets seasons

Direction of north pole / rotation axis of Solar System planets 
From inclination of rotation axis it depends the direction of vernal equinox.

Orbital planes inclinations

Orbital eccentricities

Synodic periods (years durations)

References

Astrometry